Laxmesha Suryaprakash (born 27 September 1989) is an Indian cricketer. He made his first-class debut for Tamil Nadu in the 2016–17 Ranji Trophy on 21 November 2016. He made his List A debut on 28 February 2021, for Tamil Nadu in the 2020–21 Vijay Hazare Trophy.

References

External links
 

1989 births
Living people
Indian cricketers
Tamil Nadu cricketers
Place of birth missing (living people)